Dr. Bora Kuzmanovic is a Professor of Social Psychology at Belgrade University. He was also a Member of Serbian Parliament (MP) twice as well as a Member of Parliament of The Federal Republic of Yugoslavia (MP) and later Parliament of Serbia and Montenegro for social-democratic parties. During the war in former Yugoslavia Kuzmanovic was an opponent to Slobodan Milosevic. In 1993 Kuzmanovic was a spokesman for the leading opposition party in Serbia The Democratic Party. Psychological Association of Serbia assigned to prof. Dr. Bora Kuzmanovic The Award for Lifetime Achievement in 2014.

Biography
Kuzmanovic was born in 1944 in Gornja Tresnjevica near Arandjelovac in Serbia (near the capital Belgrade). He graduated from The Faculty of Philosophy, Department of Psychology, University of Belgrade in 1967. As a postgraduate student and young assistant, he participated in the so-called rebels events of June 1968 in Belgrade. Later Kuzmanovic continued his critical and opposition activities and was expelled from the Communist Party in 1973 on charges of violating "democratic centralism". Actually, he supported opposition forces at the Faculty of Philosophy (the University of Belgrade). Kuzmanovic completed postgraduate studies in 1973 and obtained his PhD in 1987. As a University professor, he taught Social Psychology and other courses at The Department of Psychology until he retired in 2011. Kuzmanovic was the Director of The Institute of Psychology (1990-2011), President of The Serbian Psychology Society (1983-1985), President of Yugoslav Psychological Organizations (1987-1989), President of The Managing Board of The Center of Applied Psychology and President of The Managing Board of Social Sciences Institute.

Until recently he was the President of The Scientific Council of The Institute of Psychology, Member of The National Education Council of The Republic of Serbia Editor-in-Chief of the journal “Psychological Research”
His research is mostly  on social attitude and values, political behavior, authoritarianism and social motivation. He is the author and co-author of many scientific and specialized articles, studies and monographs, for example:

1) “Nezaposlena omladina Beograda” (Belgrade Unemployed Youth); with co-authors: S. Mihailovic and G. Zajic; Centar za idejni rad SSO Beograd, 1987;

2) “Studentski protest 1992” (Student Protest 1992); Project manager, Editor and Co-author; Institut za psihologiju, Beograd, 1993;

3) “Society in Crisis-Yugoslavia in the early ‘90s” (collective monograph, ed. M. Lazic); Filip Visnjic, Beograd, 1995;

4) “Drustveni karakter i drustvene promene u svetlu nacionalnih sukoba” (Social Character and Social Changes in The Light of National Conflict); co-authors: Z. Golubovic and M. Vasovic; Institut za filozofiju I drustvenu teoriju, Beograd, 1995:

5) “Social Changes and Changes of Values”; co-authors: N. Havelka and D. Popadic, Psihologija, XXVIII, Special issue, 7-26, 1995;

6) “Deca bez roditeljskog staranja” (Children Without Parental Care); Project Manager, Editor and Co-author, Institut za psihologiju and Save the Children, Beograd, 2002;

References 

1944 births
Living people
Serbian psychologists
Academic staff of the University of Belgrade
University of Belgrade Faculty of Philosophy alumni
People from Belgrade in health professions
Politicians from Belgrade
People from Aranđelovac